Newport Harbor may refer to:

Places 
 Newport Beach, California
 Newport Harbor High School, in Newport Beach, Orange County, California
 Newport Harbor Light, in Newport, Rhode Island
 Newport, Rhode Island
 Newport, Pembrokeshire

Media 
 Newport Harbor: The Real Orange County, an MTV reality show

See also 
 Newport Bay (disambiguation)